Arian Kastrati (born 15 July 2001) is a professional footballer who plays as a centre-forward for the Under-23 squad of the Portuguese club Farense. Born in the Netherlands, he has represented Kosovo at under-21 international level.

Club career

Early career and Fortuna Sittard
Kastrati started playing football at the age of 3 in VV Sittard, where after eight years he transferred to VV DVO. After a successful season with VV DVO, Kastrati was invited to be part of Fortuna Sittard. On 1 September 2017, he was named as a Fortuna Sittard substitute for the first time in a Eerste Divisie match against Almere City. His debut with Fortuna Sittard came on 10 January 2021 in a Eredivisie match against Heerenveen after coming on as a substitute in the 90th minute in place of Emil Hansson.

Loan to MVV
On 9 January 2022, Kastrati joined MVV on loan until the end of the season, with an option to buy.

Farense
On 18 August 2022, Kastrati signed with Farense in Portugal, and was initially assigned to the club's Under-23 squad.

International career
On 15 March 2021, Kastrati received a call-up from Kosovo U21 for the friendly matches against Qatar U23. Eleven days later, he made his debut with Kosovo U21 in first match against Qatar U23 after being named in the starting line-up.

Personal life
Born and raised in the Netherlands, Kastrati is of Kosovo Albanian descent.

References

External links

2001 births
Kosovan footballers
Kosovo under-21 international footballers
Dutch footballers
Living people
People from Sittard
Association football forwards
Fortuna Sittard players
MVV Maastricht players
S.C. Farense players
Eredivisie players
Slovenian Second League players
Eerste Divisie players
Kosovan expatriate footballers
Dutch expatriate footballers
Expatriate footballers in Slovenia
Kosovan expatriate sportspeople in Slovenia
Dutch expatriate sportspeople in Slovenia
Expatriate footballers in Portugal
Kosovan expatriate sportspeople in Portugal
Dutch expatriate sportspeople in Portugal
Footballers from Limburg (Netherlands)